Max Simon (1899–1961) was a German SS-Gruppenführer and lieutenant General of the Waffen-SS.

Max Simon may also refer to:

 Max Simon (mathematician) (1844–1918), German mathematician and historian of mathematics
 Max Simon Ehrlich (1909–1983), American writer
 Max Simon Nordau (1849–1923), Zionist leader, physician, and author

See also
 Simon-Max (1852–1923), French tenor
 Max Simeoni